Sumin  is a village in the administrative district of Gmina Starogard Gdański, within Starogard County, Pomeranian Voivodeship, in northern Poland. Picturesquely situated village on the edge of the lake of Sumiński with an area of 98.91 ha. A village is a very old Pomeranian settlement, about what testifies a box tomb from the last centuries before our era uncovered in 1960. Today the town has 660 residents and it is in this respect 6 - with the one, as for the size in the commune Starogard Gdański. The majority of residents are employed in farming. Somino is the oldest name of village, it's from 1270r.. Glacial troughs filled up with the water of the lake are a characteristic element of the terrain. The highest hill in the commune Starogard Gdański is 127.6 n.p.m, it is on the Sumin area i.e. in the forest, on the north- west from the forester's lodge of Wygoda. The urban planning arrangement largely dates from the 1908r. period, when it is a Prussian colonization committee made the division and settling a landed estate with Germany. After regaining independence after World War I, General Haller granted the part of agricultural farm to his soldiers, of which descendants among others are managing on them up till today.

For details of the history of the region, see History of Pomerania.

The village has a population of 580.

Monuments 

- St. John the Baptist Parish Church   1926

- Court's distillery the second half of the 19th century

- „Pod Wygodą” - the Inn

It was founded in 2000 by Gabriela Firgon.

References

Sumin